iCarly is an American comedy revival series based on the Nickelodeon 2007 TV series of the same name. The series stars Miranda Cosgrove, Jerry Trainor, Nathan Kress, Laci Mosley and Jaidyn Triplett, with Cosgrove, Trainor and Kress reprising their roles from the original series. It premiered on Paramount+ on June 17, 2021, to positive reviews. The second season premiered on April 8, 2022. A third season is scheduled to premiere in 2023.

Premise 
Nine years after the events of the previous series, Carly Shay has moved back to Seattle, where she shares an apartment with her roommate Harper. Carly's older brother Spencer has become a wealthy artist after accidentally creating a renowned sculpture. Following two divorces and a failed tech start-up, Freddie Benson has moved back to live with his mother, accompanied by his adopted 11-year-old stepdaughter Millicent. All main characters live in Bushwell Plaza, the apartment building where the original show was set. When Carly decides to relaunch her iCarly webshow, she receives mainstream attention with the help of Spencer, Freddie and her new friends.

Cast and characters

Main 
 Miranda Cosgrove as Carly Shay, a social media influencer and the host of a comedy web series
 Jerry Trainor as Spencer Shay, Carly's older brother, now a wealthy artist
 Nathan Kress as Freddie Benson, Carly's friend, neighbor, and technical producer for iCarly
 Laci Mosley as Harper, a barista and aspiring fashion stylist who is Carly's friend and roommate
 Jaidyn Triplett as Millicent, Freddie's adopted stepdaughter

Recurring 
 Lyric Lewis as Maeve (season 1), Harper's cousin who pretended to be kidnapped for four years and dates Spencer for some time
 Poppy Liu as Double Dutch (season 1; guest season 2), a pop singer who hires Harper to be her stylist.
 Josh Plasse as Wes (season 1; guest season 2), a car mechanic and a former love interest of Carly 
 Mary Scheer as Marissa Benson, Freddie's mother and Spencer's next-door neighbor. Scheer reprises her role from the original series
 Conor Husting as Beau (season 1; guest season 2), Carly's ex-boyfriend who breaks up with her at the beginning of the series
 Mia Serafino as Pearl (season 2), an animal therapist and Freddie's new girlfriend

Guest stars 
 Danielle Morrow as Nora Dershlit (season 1), an obsessive iCarly super-fan who abducted the iCarly gang multiple times. Morrow reprises her role from the original series
 Josie Totah as Willow (season 1), an influencer who appears at Spencer's exhibit
 Alex Wassabi as an ASMR influencer (season 1), who appears at Spencer's exhibit
 Reed Alexander as Nevel Papperman (season 1), a former website critic and nemesis of Carly; Alexander reprises his role from the original series
 Tim Russ as Ted Franklin (season 1), Carly and Freddie's former principal from Ridgeway; Russ reprises his role from the original series
 Doug Brochu as Duke Lubberman (season 1), a former student wrestler from Ridgeway; Brochu reprises his role from the original series
 Amanda Cerny as Harmony (season 1)
 Skye Townsend as Kiki (season 1), Millicent's scout leader in the Sunshine Girls
 Christine Taylor as Argenthina (season 1)
 Carmela Zumbado as Gwen (season 1), Millicent's mother, and Freddie's second ex-wife
 Drew Roy as Griffin (season 1), Carly's ex-boyfriend; Roy reprises his role from the original series
 Esther Povitsky as Brooke (season 1), a friend of Carly and Harper's
 Jeremy Rowley as Lewbert (season 2), the former doorman at Bushwell Plaza. Rowley reprises his role from the original series
 Ryan Ochoa as Chuck Chambers (season 2), Spencer's former child nemesis; Ochoa reprises his role from the original series
 Ethan Munck as Guppy (season 2), Gibby's younger brother; Munck, the real life brother of Noah (Gibby), reprises his role from the original series
 Greg Mullavey as Granddad Shay (season 2), Carly and Spencer’s granddad; Mullavey reprises his role from the original series
 Tony Amendola as Vinny (season 2), a man who wants to murder Granddad Shay for stealing his coins
 Rachel Bloom as McKenna (season 2), a matchmaker
 Josh Peck as Paul (season 2), Carly's manager
 Kandy Muse as Cruella Intentions (season 2)
 Mo Heart as Auntie Histamine (season 2)
 Scarlet Envy as Lana Del Slay (season 2)
 Rosé as Kimmy Kimmy Moore (season 2)
 Hannah Stocking as Sunny, the leader of an underground fight club for influencers (season 2)

Episodes

Series overview

Season 1 (2021)

Season 2 (2022)

Production

Development 
Then-Nickelodeon executive Paula Kaplan contacted Cosgrove with a pitch for a new iCarly series, revolving around Carly and Spencer running a Hype House-like content house with a new generation of influencers taking influence from the iCarly web show. The demographic for the show was planned to be aimed towards kids, following in the same footsteps as other revivals and spin-offs like Disney Channel's Raven's Home and Girl Meets World. "I don't think that any of us would have been up for that [idea]," she says. "What excited me about doing iCarly again was getting to put the characters in situations that we couldn't show before." Cosgrove contacted Jerry Trainor, Nathan Kress and Jennette McCurdy about the project. Kress and Trainor were on board with the project, however McCurdy declined. After multiple conversations with the returning cast, Cosgrove requested that the revival series be aimed towards the adults who grew up with it, which ViacomCBS and AwesomenessTV immediately agreed to, unlike the shelved Lizzie McGuire series being developed at Disney+. As the executive producer of the series, Cosgrove wanted to incorporate more mature topics and diversity into the series, as well as nostalgia.

The series was announced in December 2020, with Jay Kogen and Ali Schouten serving as co-showrunners and executive producers. Cosgrove, Kress, and Trainor would reprise their roles from the original series. In February 2021, it was reported that Kogen left the project due to "creative differences" with Cosgrove. Later that month, McCurdy confirmed that she would not reprise her role of Sam Puckett for the revival, as a result of quitting acting and feeling embarrassed by her past career. It was also revealed that the revival had been picked up for 13 episodes, with the pilot being directed by Phill Lewis, and written by Kogen and Schouten. In May, the premiere date was revealed to be June 17, 2021, with a teaser image also being revealed. On June 1, the first official trailer of the revival was released. On July 15, the series was renewed for a second season.

On July 27, 2022, the series was renewed for a third season, which is scheduled to premiere in 2023.

Casting 
In March 2021, it was reported that Laci Mosley had been cast as Harper, Carly's new roommate and best friend, and that Jaidyn Triplett had been cast as Millicent, Freddie's snarky and social media-obsessed step-daughter. Since the announcement of her casting, Mosley has been the target of attacks from fans who saw her as a replacement for Jennette McCurdy's character from the original. In response, Franchesca Ramsey, one of the writers of the show, tweeted "Laci's character Harper isn't replacing Sam. No one could replace Jennette McCurdy or her incredible talent! But it's both racist as hell & completely unfair to decide that Laci hasn't earned her role especially since the show isn't even out yet!!"

Filming 
In March 2021, filming for the revival had officially begun. Production on the first season ended on June 25, 2021. Production on the second season began in October 2021 and ended on February 2, 2022.

Release 
The first three episodes were released on June 17, 2021, with subsequent episodes releasing weekly until August 26, 2021. The first episode, albeit slightly shortened, aired on Nick at Nite on July 17, 2021. The second season premiered on April 8, 2022. "iObject, Lewbert!" became the second episode overall to receive a linear airing, leading out of the 2022 Kids' Choice Awards on April 9 on Nickelodeon, as well as an airing on MTV on April 19, 2022.

Reception

Critical response 
Critics gave the first season positive reviews. On the review aggregator Rotten Tomatoes, the first season holds a 100% approval rating with an average rating of 6.7/10, based on eight reviews.

Awards and nominations

References

External links
 
 
 

2021 American television series debuts
2020s American sitcoms
2020s American comedy television series
2020s American LGBT-related comedy television series
2021 series
English-language television shows
Paramount+ original programming
American sequel television series
Bisexuality-related television series
Race-related controversies in television
Television shows set in Seattle
Television series about social media